is a former Japanese football player.

Playing career
Watada was born in Kobe on 26 March 1976. After graduating from University of Tsukuba, he joined his local club Vissel Kobe in 1998. He played many matches as substitute forward from first season and as regular player from 2000. In 2001, he moved to JEF United Ichihara on loan. In 2003, he returned to Vissel Kobe. Although he could not play at all in the match in 2003, he played as substitute and scored many goals in 2004. In 2006, he moved to Regional Leagues club Banditonce Kobe. However he could hardly play in the match. In 2007, he moved to Japan Football League (JFL) club FC Gifu. He played many matches and the club was promoted to J2 League end of 2007 season. In 2008, he moved to JFL club FC Kariya. He retired end of 2008 season.

Club statistics

References

External links

Kariya

1976 births
Living people
University of Tsukuba alumni
Association football people from Hyōgo Prefecture
Japanese footballers
J1 League players
Japan Football League players
Vissel Kobe players
JEF United Chiba players
FC Gifu players
FC Kariya players
Association football forwards